DJ lighting is a variant of stage lighting that is used by mobile DJs and in nightclubs. DJ lighting is generally used by mobile disco DJs and in most modern nightclubs and many late-night bars.

There are many different types of DJ lighting such as scanners which use a mirror to reflect beams of light that move around, twister-style effects that project multiple beams of light that rotate in a twisting style and also strobe lighting that flash intensely.

DJ lighting can be controlled by an internal sound activation, where the unit has a built-in sound to light function. Other control options are master-slave (daisy chain) and DMX control.

Types of DJ lighting 

It is generally considered that there are four types of DJ lighting.

Party lights 
In the DJ equipment industry, any party disco light that is designed and sold for home use is considered a party DJ light or a party disco light.

Retro lights 
In the early days of disco, the main types of disco light were colorful rotating balls. They looked very much like a mirrorball with multi-coloured par 16 lamps in them.

Projectors 
With the technology of halogen lamps improving, the 80s and early 90s saw a new breed of DJ light starting to evolve. This was a projection-style DJ light that used a halogen lamp and a mirror to reflect the light. A halogen lamp shines onto a mirror via a filter gel sheet to create the color and sometimes via a gobo wheel to create shapes. In some DJ lighting effects a coloured mirror is used to avoid using color/filter gel.

Most modern projector DJ lights now use LEDs instead of halogen lamps.

Lasers 
Lasers are a relatively new type of DJ light. They use a laser diode and an array of mirrors to project multiple colours and beams of light.

DJ Equipment
Stage Lighting